The RMb-93 is a pump-action shotgun designed and manufactured by the KBP Instrument Design Bureau of Tula, Russia. It is the baseline model of the Rys ("Lynx") series of shotguns, taking the modelname of Rys-K. The RMb-93 has been conceived as a combat weapon for Special Forces and Police units that might face Close Quarters Battle situations. The weapon is thus engineered to reduce size and encumbrance as much as possible.

Description 
The working system of the RMb-93 is itself an odd slide-action operation called "Inverted Cycle", similar in concept to the one used in the South-African Truvelo Armoury Neostead shotgun (the only other mass-produced firearm to be based upon this system).  The feeding tube is placed over the barrel rather than under it, and is accessed through a flip-up cover on the top of the receiver. Once the weapon is loaded, a shell is chambered by pushing the slide forward-then-backward, instead of the standard backward-then-forward motion of the forend found on most pump-action weapons. Having the RMb-93 a fixed breech face and movable barrel, the operation moves the entire barrel assembly. Once a round is fired and another is chambered, the empty shell falls downwards to the ground, pushed by its own weight.
The design of the RMb-93 "Rys-K" carries several advantages: the ejection system makes the gun fully ambidextrous, and the magazine located over the barrel gives the shotgun a low center of mass and reduces upward recoil. The main drawback of the overall design stands in the fact that the weapon has a pistol grip with upfolding metal stock, which when folded finds itself right up the feeding tube. The RMb-93 thus can not be reloaded without extending or removing the stock, a disadvantage if it is being used tactically with a folded stock.

Variants and commercial availability 
The RMb-93 "Rys-K" shotgun is commercially available to civilians in Canada, Russia, Italy and possibly in other Countries. For the civilian distribution in Russia and Canada, the shotgun is provided with a stock disconnector that prevents it from firing if the stock is not extended, so to comply with local laws and regulation about the minimum legal length for civilian firearms.

Additionally, KBP manufactures several variants of the "Rys" shotgun series for the civilian distribution. The RMb-93 "Rys-K" itself is manufactured with Phosphatized finish to resist salt corrosion (for use in maritime environments). The RMO-93 "Rys" is a purely sporting variant with wooden thumbhole stock and either wooden or synthetic slide-forend; very similar to it is the "Rys-OT" variant with longer barrel, synthetic or wooden slide-forend and standard wooden shotgun stock.

The RMF-93 "Rys-F" shotgun is a longer-barrel variant of the RMb-93 "Rys-K", plus equipped with the above-mentioned stock disconnector.

RMS-93 Rys (Lynx" ( p uzhё m The store on hotniche 93 years) - the civilian version of RMB-93. Available in the following versions:
 Rys-F  - option length 809 mm with 680 mm barrel with a folding butt up and forward (in RMB-93).
 Rys-O  - version 1080 mm long and 680 mm barrel with a wooden butt awkward.
 Rys-OC  - version of 1080 mm with 680 mm barrel chambered for 12/76.
 Rys-K  - version with folding butt up and forward and shortened to 528 mm barrel (in this version, the RMS-93 is similar to RMB 93, but has the auto-lock the trigger when the stock is folded).
 Rys-U  - option 918 mm and 528 mm barrel with a wooden butt awkward having a hole for the thumb.
 Rys-CA  - option 924 mm 534 mm with barrel chambered for 12/76.
 Rys-L  - lengths 928 mm and 528 mm barrel with a wooden butt awkward.
 Rys-LC  - option 934 mm 534 mm with barrel chambered for 12/76.

Users

  - RMF-93 "Rys-F" is allowed as civilian hunting weapon
  - RMF-93 "Rys-F", RMO-93-2 "Rys-K" and RM-96 "Rys-U" are allowed as civilian hunting weapon
  - RMO-93 and RMF-93 "Rys-F" are allowed as civilian hunting weapon since August 1996 Also, they were used in private security companies until 1 March 2006

See also
List of Russian weaponry

References

Sources

External links 

 KBP: RMB-93 "Rys-K" 12-Gauge Magazine Shotgun
 "Rys" 12-Gauge Hunting and Sporting Shotguns
 Enemy Forces: RMB-93 Smoothbore Shotgun
 Nazarian's Gun Recognition Guide: RMB-93
 Modern Firearms: RMB-93

Shotguns of Russia
Pump-action shotguns
TsKIB SOO products
Weapons and ammunition introduced in 1993